His Best Friend (German:Sein bester Freund) is a 1918 German silent film directed by Uwe Jens Krafft and starring Max Landa as the detective Joe Deebs.

Cast
In alphabetical order
 Wilhelm Diegelmann 
 Käthe Haack 
 Max Landa as Joe Deebs  
 Lina Paulsen as Tante Wilhelmine  
 Hermann Picha

References

Bibliography
 James Robert Parish & Kingsley Canham. Film Directors Guide: Western Europe. Scarecrow Press, 1976.

External links

1918 films
Films directed by Uwe Jens Krafft
German silent feature films
Films of the German Empire
German black-and-white films
1910s German films